Congreso de Tucumán is a station on Line D of the Buenos Aires Underground and is the current terminus. The station was opened on 27 April 2000 as the western terminus of the extension of the line from Juramento. It is located at the intersection of Cabildo and Congreso avenues. As of June 2015, the station connects to the Metrobus Cabildo bus rapid transit line that was opened that year. New underground passageways and station entrances were made for the station to provide easy transfer to the Metrobus line.

See also
 Santa Fe Avenue

References

External links

Buenos Aires Underground stations
2000 establishments in Argentina